Provost Square is a partially built apartment complex in Jersey City, New Jersey developed by Toll Brothers. It will consists of two towers, one of which was completed in 2015 and called the Morgan. Work began on the site of 2nd tower in 2015. Phase 2 is 1.5 million square feet. The three buildings are claimed to have a synergy that will increase their utility and value.

It is being eclipsed by a larger building boom and architectural revival that is taking place in Jersey City, which has now moved toward tall towers.

See also
List of tallest buildings in Jersey City

References

Notes

Citations

Skyscrapers in Jersey City, New Jersey